The Grand Bazaar is an old historical bazaar in Tehran, Iran.

In addition to shops, the Grand Bazaar contains mosques, guest houses, and banks. It has access to the rapid transit system of Tehran Metro through the stations of Khayam and Khordad 15th.

History

Trade and early bazaars in Tehran
The area around Tehran has been settled since at least the 6th millennium BC, and while bazaar-like constructions in Iran as a whole have been dated as far back as the 4th millennium BC, Tehran's bazaar is not that old. It is hard to say exactly when the bazaar first appeared, but in the centuries after the Muslim conquest of Iran, travelers reported the growth of commerce in the area now occupied by the current bazaar. The Grand Bazaar is thus a continuation of this legacy.

Research indicates that a portion of today's bazaar predated the growth of the village of Tehran by the time of the Safavid Empire, although it was during and after this period that the bazaar began to grow gradually. Western travelers reported that, by 1660 CE and beyond, the bazaar area had still been largely open and only partially covered.

Development

Despite relying heavily on this historical legacy, much of the bazaar itself was constructed much later. The oldest surviving buildings, that is to say, the walls and passages in the bazaar, rarely exceed 400 years, with many being constructed or rebuilt within the last 200 years. The bazaar grew as a "city within a city" for much of the 19th century, and was able to expand largely and without much outside interference. However, under the reign of Reza Shah, as Tehran began to grow and reform exponentially in the early 20th century, the changes brought by this rapid development saw much of the bazaar disappear.

The old sections of the bazaar are generally similar in architectural style, while the parts added in the 20th century often look remarkably different. Critics say that little consideration had been given for the construction of these new sections. However, in the late 20th century, some projects were undertaken in order to beautify the bazaar through the use of plaster moulding and decorative brickwork.

Bazaari

The bazaar is viewed as a force of conservatism in the Iranian society, providing strong links between the clergy and the middle class traders. The 1979 Revolution received strong backing from these forces, and as one of the most important bazaars in the country, the Grand Bazaar of Tehran was a center for pro-revolutionary feeling and finance.

There were several reasons why the bazaar class worked hard to help advance the revolution. The government of Mohammed Reza Pahlavi was anathema to the bazaaris, who seemed set to lose out as the country was being industrialized, and they feared that they would be left behind and their status in society would be reduced. Similarly, another concern for the bazaar class, not just in Tehran but throughout Iran, was that these traditional economic forces did not benefit from the 1974–1978 oil boom, and were thus even more inclined to aid the revolution. As such, the Grand Bazaar of Tehran was a hotbed of support for the revolution, which positioned itself opposite the monarchy. The Grand Bazaar continues largely to support the establishment, particularly as conservative political forces often adopt a low tax, laissez-faire approach to the bazaaris.

Today, the Grand Bazaar is still an important place of commerce. However, much of the city's trade and finance has been moved to new gentrified and upscale parts of northern Tehran. In addition to traditional goods, the market for watches and local jewelry is apparently growing, most likely as a result of the growth of tourism. The bazaar is busiest around midday, and between 17:00 and 19:00.

Gallery

See also
 Economy of Iran
 Iranian architecture

References
 - "Iransaga - Some Places of Interest in Tehran"
 - "BBC News - Tehran bazaar feels winds of change"
 - "About Tehran Bazaar in Tehran province". Tourist Attractions. Web Archive 2006.
 - Abbas "Bazaar, the achievement of the Islamic civilisation. A short history of the Tehran Bazaar" from The Newsletter of Chamber of Commerce, Feb. 1994 (Chamber of Commerce, Industries & Mines of the Islamic Republic of Iran). Web Archive 2007.
 - - "Iran Oil Revenues and the Acceleration of Modernization, 1960-79"
 - "Who is the mayor of Tehran?"
 - "Iran Daily: Tehran Grand Bazaar To Get Facelift (Oct 12 2005)

External links

Tehran Grand Bazzar in google map

Buildings and structures in Tehran
Architecture in Iran
Bazaars in Iran
Tourist attractions in Tehran
National works of Iran